Arne Arvidsson (19 January 1929 – 30 September 2008) was a Swedish footballer who played as a goalkeeper. He also played bandy for Djurgårdens IF Bandy in the 1960s.

Club career
Arvidsson started his career in Långshyttans AIK and joined Djurgårdens IF in 1952. He made his debut in a game against Hälsingborgs IF the same year. With Djurgården, he won the Allsvenskan in 1954–55, 1959, 1964. In 1966, he joined IK Sirius for two seasons. In 1973, he was back in Djurgårdens IF for one Intertoto Cup match.

International career
He made his international debut in the 1952–55 Nordic Football Championship match against Norway national football team. In total, he made 27 appearances.

Honours 

 Djurgårdens IF 
 Allsvenskan: 1954–55, 1959, 1964
 Division 2 Svealand: 1961

References

External links

Swedish footballers
1929 births
2008 deaths
Allsvenskan players
Djurgårdens IF Fotboll players
IFK Eskilstuna players
IK Sirius Fotboll players
Sweden international footballers
Association football goalkeepers
Swedish bandy players
Djurgårdens IF Bandy players